Summerfield is a Canadian rural community in Queens County, Prince Edward Island.

It is located southeast of Kensington.

External links
 Government of PEI profile

Communities in Queens County, Prince Edward Island